Baynesia is a genus of flowering plants in the family Apocynaceae. Its only species is Baynesia lophophora, endemic to Namibia. It was first discovered by Peter Bruyns in 1999, and first described by him in 2000.

References

Asclepiadoideae
Monotypic Apocynaceae genera
Taxonomy articles created by Polbot